Thomas Wilson (May 16, 1827 – April 3, 1910) was an American lawyer, Minnesota congressman and state legislator, associate justice and the second chief justice of the Minnesota Supreme Court.

Wilson was born in Dungannon, County Tyrone, Ireland, U.K.; attended the common schools; immigrated to the United States in 1839 with his parents, who settled in Venango County, Pennsylvania; was graduated from Allegheny College, Meadville, Pennsylvania, in 1852; studied law; was admitted to the bar in February 1855 and commenced practice in Winona, Minnesota; member of the Minnesota Constitutional convention in 1857; judge of the third judicial district court 1857 – 1864; associate justice of the Minnesota Supreme Court in 1864; chief justice from 1865 to July 1869, when he resigned; resumed the practice of law; member of the Minnesota House of Representatives 1880 – 1882; served in the Minnesota Senate 1882–1885; elected as a Democrat to the Fiftieth Congress (March 4, 1887 – March 3, 1889); unsuccessful candidate for re-election; unsuccessful candidate for governor in 1890; delegate to the Democratic National Convention in 1892; general counsel for the Chicago, St. Paul, Minneapolis & Omaha Railroad until his death in Saint Paul, Minnesota, April 3, 1910; interment in Woodlawn Cemetery, Winona, Minnesota.

External links 

1827 births
1910 deaths
Democratic Party members of the Minnesota House of Representatives
Democratic Party Minnesota state senators
People from Dungannon
People from Winona, Minnesota
Chief Justices of the Minnesota Supreme Court
Minnesota state court judges
Democratic Party members of the United States House of Representatives from Minnesota
19th-century American politicians
19th-century American judges